The 1980 Tour de France was the 67th edition of the Tour de France. In the first half of the race, Bernard Hinault started out strong by winning the prologue and two stages. However, knee problems forced Hinault to abandon the race while still in the lead. Joop Zoetemelk became the new leader, and defended that position successfully. Just as in 1979 when Hinault and Zoetemelk finished nearly a half hour ahead of the rest of the field, the 1980 edition was a battle between these two riders until Hinault abandoned. At the time Hinault was just 21 seconds ahead of Zoetemelk and the race was about to enter the Pyrenees. Zoetemelk did not wear the yellow jersey during stage 13 though he did in every stage thereafter finishing the race with nearly a seven-minute advantage over second place Hennie Kuiper. It was his first Tour victory in his tenth attempt, after already having finished second in five editions.

The points classification was won by Rudy Pevenage, who also won the intermediate sprints classification. The mountains classification was won by Raymond Martin, and Johan van der Velde won the young rider classification.

Teams

Two weeks before the Tour would start, there were only twelve teams interested in starting the Tour. The teams with Italian and Spanish sponsors were focussed on the Giro d'Italia and the Vuelta a España, and thought their cyclists were not able to compete in two grand tours in one year. This prevented Giovanni Battaglin of the Spanish-based , the winner of the mountains classification of 1979, from defending his title. Francesco Moser, who had left the 1980 Giro d'Italia injured, was the only Italian cyclist on the initial starting list, but he was not able to start, so the 1980 Tour was without Italian cyclists. One more team was added to the starting list, so the Tour 1980 started with thirteen teams, each with ten cyclists. The Boston–Mavic–Amis du Tour team was a combination of the Belgian Boston–Mavic team and French cyclists without a contract, combined into the "Amis du Tour" team.

The teams entering the race were:

 
 
 
 
 
 
 
 
 
 
 Boston–Mavic–Amis du Tour

Pre-race favourites

The three most important favourites for the victory were Bernard Hinault, Joop Zoetemelk and Hennie Kuiper. Hinault was the winner of the two last editions, and had earlier that year won the 1980 Giro d'Italia. Zoetemelk, the runner-up of the last two editions, had switched teams to the TI–Raleigh team, which was considered one of the strongest teams. Kuiper had left the TI–Raleigh team and moved to the Peugeot team. The manager of that team, Maurice De Muer, had already managed Bernard Thévenet to a Tour win, and this made Kuiper confident.

Route and stages

The 1980 Tour de France started on 26 June, and had two rest days, in Saint-Malo and Morzine.

Before the race, Hinault expressed dissatisfaction with the cobbled sections in stages five and six. In the 1979 Tour, Hinault had lost time in these sections, and he considered to organise a strike. Even though no strike was held, the route was still changed: after the fifth stage, tour organiser Félix Lévitan decided to change the first  of the stage, to avoid the worst cobbled sections.

The 25 stages were won by riders from only four countries. In this year's edition of the Tour, the last rider in the General Classification after the consecutives mountain stages (16-19) was eliminated.

Race overview

The prologue was won by Hinault, who finished :05 ahead of Gerrie Knetemann and 0:23 ahead of the closest General Classification rider Hennie Kuiper. Stage 1A was a sprint finish won by Jan Raas and Stage 1B was the first Team Time Trial in which TI–Raleigh claimed the victory ahead of Renault and Peugeot gaining enough in the time bonus for Knetemann to become the new leader. In Stage 2 Rudy Pevenage, Yvon Bertin and Pierre Bazzo escaped in a breakaway and were able to stay away the entire stage winning by nearly ten minutes over the rest of the field. Pevenage claimed the stage victory with Bazzo taking second and while Bertin took third he was the highest placed of the three and took over the lead in the general classification.

Stage 3 was won by Henk Lubberding and Bertin ended up falling off the back losing considerable time, which made Pevenage the new overall leader going into the second individual time trial (ITT) in Stage 4. Bernard Hinault was aiming to win his third straight Tour de France and in the ITT he looked to be well on his way dominating the rest of the field. Of the 122 riders remaining in the main field only six of them were able to come within 2:00 of Hinault and nobody was able to finish within a minute of the defending champ. Joop Zoetemelk was the closest to him taking second place at 1:16 back and in the overall situation overall Pevenage remained leader by about a minute over Bazzo with Hinault closing the gap to within six minutes.

Stage 5 was run in terrible weather, but the aggressive Hinault was looking to distance himself from the competition and went on the offensive together with Kuiper. Hinault won the stage, with Kuiper finishing right on his wheel, gaining more than two minutes on all of the other of the General Classification Riders although following this stage many riders began experiencing tendinitis problems, including Hinault. 
Going into Stage 6 Hinault was within four minutes of Pevenage in the general classification and built a lead of more than 3:00 on Kuiper, nearly 4:00 on Zoetemelk and more than 5:00 on Raymond Martin and Joaquim Agostinho. The stage was won by Jean-Louis Gauthier by a full second over the rest of the field with no major changes in the overall classification.

Stage 7A would prove to be the beginning of a remarkable run by the TI–Raleigh team, who won the team time trial (TTT) beginning a stretch where a rider from this team would win seven stages in a row. During this TTT Hinault's knee problems were showing, as he could not do his part of the workload, although his Renault team still managed a respectable 4th place behind Raleigh, Peugeot and Ijsboerke.
‘Panzer Group Post’ as they were known because of their Directeur Sportif Peter Post, attacked relentlessly in an effort to win stages and contain any attacks made by Hinault to put Zoetemelk in a position where he could defeat Hinault in the upcoming high mountain stages. The plan was working as Stage 7B was won by Jan Raas, Stage 8 by Bert Oosterbosch, Raas would win again in Stage 9 and Stage 10 was won by Cees Priem. After stage 10 Pevenage was still in Yellow by 2:44 over Bazzo with a 4:20 advantage over Hinault, however The Badger was in the lead among the serious contenders although his lead over Zoetemelk had been cut to 2:00 with Kuiper 2:24 behind Hinault.

Stage 11 was a time trial prior to going into the high mountains of the Pyrenees and if Hinault wanted to match the likes of Louison Bobet, Jacques Anquetil and Eddy Merckx by winning his third Tour de France in a row he would have to perform well. The day however, belonged to Zoetemelk as he took the Stage victory with only eight riders finishing within 2:00 of him. Finishing 0:46 behind was Hennie Kuiper with Agostinho coming in 3rd, Oosterbosch finishing 4th and Hinault in 5th 1:39 back. Hinault was back in the yellow jersey but his lead over Zoetemelk was a minuscule 0:21. Rudy Pevenage fell to 3rd place and Kuiper was 1:31 back with no other general classification (GC) contenders within 5:00. Normally, Hinault was the better time trialist, so Zoetemelk's stage victory made him confident that he had the chance to win the Tour.

In Stage 12 Gerrie Knetemann and Ludo Peeters escaped and managed to beat the Peloton by more than a minute with Knetemann beating Peeters at the finish line. Late that evening, with the first stage of the high mountains looming, Hinault decided to withdraw. Zoetemelk, until that moment second in the general classification, became the new leader, but refused to don the yellow jersey during the following stage following the example of Eddy Merckx who refused to wear it in the 1971 Tour de France after Luis Ocaña left the race as leader. In Stage 13, Zoetemelk rode in his notoriously conservative style, allowing Raymond Martin to escape, as he was a distant threat in the general classification, but he kept Kuiper close, who was now his main rival for the overall victory. Zoetemelk would not stray from who he was as a rider and maintained this defensive tactic for the rest of the race. Martin won the stage breaking the impressive streak of TI–Raleigh and climbing into 3rd place in the process. Not only this but during this stage he distinguished himself as the strongest rider on a very talented Miko–Mercier team, who also had Christian Seznec and Sven-Åke Nilsson as GC contenders and for the previous several years also had Zoetemelk, who remained the overall leader, with Kuiper in 2nd place at 1:10 behind him. In Stage 14 Ludo Peeters escaped again, this time finishing alone more than a minute ahead of the Peloton for the stage win and in Stage 15 Bernard Vallet gutted out an impressive win finishing just four seconds ahead of Jean-Raymond Toso and the 1975 Tour de France and 1977 Tour de France winner Bernard Thévenet who was nearing the end of his remarkable career.

Going into Stage 16 Zoetemelk was now 1:18 ahead of Kuiper and 5:03 ahead of his former teammate Martin. In the 16th stage, one of Zoetemelk's present teammates Johan van der Velde, who had been riding a very good Tour, nearly fell off his bike and cut off  Zoetemelk with van der Velde's back tire hitting Zoetemelk's front causing him to viciously crash into the pavement. Zoetemelk quickly remounted and continued the race but was bleeding from his arm and thigh. Jos De Schoenmaecker won the stage with the group of favourites coming in over a minute later as Zoetemelk was not only able to get back to the elite group, but he also put another 0:16 into Kuiper .

The fall in the 16th stage did affect Zoetemelk's performance in stage 17, as Zoetemelk had to let others go on the first climb. Helped by the Panzer Group, he was able to stay close to his competitors and was in good position for the final climb. Mariano Martinez survived his breakaway attempt and won the stage as Zoetemelk was able to drop 2nd place Kuiper, who came partially unhinged losing almost 1:30. 3rd place Raymond Martin was able to leave Zoetemelk behind but it was near the end of the stage and by this point it was too little too late as he was only able to take 0:15 back. In Stage 18 Ludo Loos escaped and crossed all five cols first, finishing more than five minutes ahead of the Peloton in a remarkable solo stage win which turned out to be the only Tour stage victory of his career. Zoetemelk finished in the second group with Robert Alban and Lucien Van Impe nearly a minute ahead of Martin and 2:30 ahead of Kuiper who fell to 3rd place as Martin moved into 2nd. With the Alps now finished the last obstacle in the way of Zoetemelk winning his first Tour de France was the time trial in Stage 20.

Stage 19 was an Intermediate stage in which Sean Kelly and Ismael Lejarreta beat the Peloton to the line by 0:20 and Kelly earned his second career stage win by winning the sprint. The overall situation remained the same going into the time trial which was won in dominating fashion by Joop Zoetemelk with only one rider coming within a minute of him and that rider was his own teammate Gerrie Knetemann. With Kuiper and Joaquim Agostinho finishing in 3rd and 4th at plus 1:12 and 1:13 respectively, Zoetemelk was now virtually assured of the overall victory with his lead now built to about 7:00 over Kuiper, who moved back into 2nd having a considerably better ride than Martin.

Stage 21 was a flat stage which was once again won by Sean Kelly and while Kelly rode an impressive Tour competing for the points classification, he ended up finishing second in that classification to Rudy Pevenage. Between 1982 and 1989 Kelly would go on to win the points classification four times. On the final stage into Paris the blossoming star was in good position for the final sprint to go for another stage win, but he was beat to the line by Pol Verschuere, who won the first Tour stage of his career that afternoon on the Champs-Élysées. Zoetemelk crossed in the middle of the pack side by side with teammate Gerrie Knetemann, who hoisted Zoetemelk's arm into the air while crossing the finish line.

 would win one of the Team Competitions and also claim an astonishing eleven stage wins, a feat which has not been repeated since.

Doping
Shortly before the start of the Tour, it was announced that Dietrich Thurau had tested positive in his national championship. He was allowed to start the Tour while his B-sample was being tested. His B-sample gave a negative result, so he could continue the Tour.

On the day of the final time trial, when it was all but clear that Zoetemelk would be the winner, tour director Jacques Goddet wrote in the newspaper l'Équipe that the only thing that could keep Zoetemelk away from a Tour victory was the drug tests for anabolic products after the eighteenth stage. As the director, Goddet was well-informed about drug tests, and many journalists speculated that his comments meant that Zoetemelk's A-sample had returned positive. Zoetemelk had tested positive in 1977, and was not happy about the insinuations. Tour co-director Félix Lévitan apologised for Goddet's choice of words.

At the end of the Tour, it was announced that all doping tests had returned negative.

Classification leadership and minor prizes

There were several classifications in the 1980 Tour de France, four of them awarding jerseys to their leaders. The most important was the general classification, calculated by adding each cyclist's finishing times on each stage. The cyclist with the least accumulated time was the race leader, identified by the yellow jersey; the winner of this classification is considered the winner of the Tour. In the 1979 Tour de France, Gerhard Schönbacher and Philippe Tesnière had both been trying to finish last, which had received attention from the press. The Tour organisation wanted to the press to focus on the winners, so they added the rule that after the 14th to 20th stage, the last-ranked cyclist in the general classification would be removed.

Additionally, there was a points classification, where cyclists got points for finishing among the best in a stage finish, or in intermediate sprints. The cyclist with the most points lead the classification, and was identified with a green jersey.

There was also a mountains classification. The organisation had categorised some climbs as either hors catégorie, first, second, third, or fourth-category; points for this classification were won by the first cyclists that reached the top of these climbs first, with more points available for the higher-categorised climbs. The cyclist with the most points lead the classification, and wore a white jersey with red polka dots.

Another classification was the young rider classification. This was decided the same way as the general classification, but only cyclists younger than 24 were eligible, and the leader wore a white jersey.

The fifth individual classification was the intermediate sprints classification. This classification had similar rules as the points classification, but only points were awarded on intermediate sprints. In 1980, this classification had no associated jersey.

A combination classification was also calculated; this was done by adding the points for the points classification, mountains classification, intermediate sprints classification and combativity award. A new competition was introduced in 1980, sponsored by the French television station TF1, therefore named "Grand Prix TF1". It was calculated from the results in the other classifications, and therefore seen as a successor of the combination classification that was calculated from 1968 to 1974. There was no jersey associated with the Grand Prix TF1. The Belgian Ludo Peeters won this classification.

For the team classification, the times of the best three cyclists per team on each stage were added; the leading team was the team with the lowest total time. The riders in the team that led this classification were identified by yellow caps. There was also a team points classification. Cyclists received points according to their finishing position on each stage, with the first rider receiving one point. The first three finishers of each team had their points combined, and the team with the fewest points led the classification. The riders of the team leading this classification wore green caps.

In addition, there was a combativity award given after each mass-start stage to the cyclist considered most combative. The split stages each had a combined winner. The decision was made by a jury composed of journalists who gave points. The cyclist with the most points from votes in all stages led the combativity classification. Christian Levavasseur won this classification, and was given overall the super-combativity award. The Souvenir Henri Desgrange was given in honour of Tour founder Henri Desgrange to the first rider to pass the summit of the Col du Galibier on stage 17. This prize was won by Johan De Muynck.

Final standings

General classification

Points classification

Mountains classification

Young rider classification

Combination classification

Intermediate sprints classification

Team classification

Team points classification

Aftermath
After it was said that Zoetemelk only won because Hinault abandoned, Zoetemelk replied "Surely winning the Tour is a question of health and robustness? If Hinault does not have that health and robustness and I have, that makes me a valid winner." Hinault agreed to that, saying that it was the absent rider (Hinault) who is at fault, not the one who replaces him.

In the individual time trial prior to the start of the mountain stages Zoetemelk dominated Hinault to come within 21 seconds of the overall lead. While Hinault was rarely beaten in any individual time trial, it was common knowledge that Zoetemelk was probably the best mountain climber in the world and with the mountain stages about to begin it is unlikely Hinault's lead of 21 seconds would have held.

Hinault's knee problems were solved before the 1980 UCI Road World Championships, which he won.

References

Bibliography

External links

 
1980 in road cycling
1980
1980 in French sport
June 1980 sports events in Europe
July 1980 sports events in Europe
1980 Super Prestige Pernod